Voice of the Voiceless is the debut studio album by Portuguese progressive metalcore supergroup Borderlands, released on June 10, 2016.

Music 
On Voice of the Voiceless Borderlands incorporate elements of progressive metalcore, metalcore, deathcore, melodic metalcore and djent

Track listing

Personnel

Band 
Rui Martins - Lead vocals
Yuri José - Guitar
Hugo Capelo - Guitar
Gonçalo Beco - Bass
Cristóvão "Kiki" Monteiro - Drums

Production 
Nicolas Delestrade - Mixing, Mastering

References 

2016 albums
Borderlands (band) albums